Konwent Polonia (Polish full name Korporacja Akademicka Konwent Polonia) is a Polish student corporation. It is the oldest active Polish student corporation.

The corporation is established in 1828 at Tartu University.

In 1919 the corporation moved to Vilnius, Lithuania. In Vilnius, it was active until 1939. When Lithuanian SSR was established then the corporation existed in exile. The strongest chapter existed in London.

References

External links

Student organisations in Poland
1928 establishments in Estonia